Gott Och Blandat is the debut studio album by the Swedish bubblegum dance/eurodance group Caramell. The album gets its name from the candy with the same name by Malaco.

Track list
 "Jag Ser På Dig (I Look At U)"
 "Skattjakt (Treasure Hunt)"
 "Efter Plugget (After School) (a cover of the Factory song of the same name)"
 "Mr Cowboy"
 "Om Du Var Min (If U Were Mine)"
 "Bara Vänner (Just Friends)"
 "Simsalabim (Abracadabra)"
 "Telefon (Telephone)"
 "Explodera (Upp Som Dynamit) (Up Like Dynamite)"
 "Som En Saga (Like A Fairytale)"
 "Kom Och Ta Mig (Come & Take Me)"
 "Luftballong (Hot-Air Balloon)"
 "Vingar (Wings)"

1999 debut albums
Caramell albums